The Dudes Doin' Business is an album by organist Jimmy McGriff and vocalist Junior Parker featuring performances recorded in 1970 and originally released on the Capitol label. The album was reissued as Good Things Don't Happen Every Day on the Groove Merchant label in 1972.

Reception 

Robert Christgau said: "A waste. Vocalist Parker, an underrated blues pro, and organist McGriff, who has a name as a soloist but is better off accompanying, should produce a more than passable record almost automatically. But not when they're burdened with strings, insipid soprano choruses, and hopelessly inappropriate material".

Track listing
 "Drownin' on Dry Land" (Mickey Gregory, Alan Jones) – 3:06	
 "Good Things Don't Happen Every Day" (Horace Ott) – 3:10
 "Ain't That a Shame" (Fats Domino, Dave Bartholomew) – 2:48	
 "A Losing Battle" (Mac Rebennack) – 3:17
 "It Ain't What'cha Got" (Gloria Caldwell, J. Wolf) – 2:51
 "In the Heat of the Night" (Quincy Jones, Alan Bergman, Marilyn Bergman) – 4:44	
 "Workin'" (Ott, Al Stewart) – 3:46	
 "Oh! Darling" (John Lennon, Paul McCartney) – 3:38
 "The Inner Light" (George Harrison) – 3:51

Personnel
Jimmy McGriff – organ
Junior Parker – vocals, harmonica
Horace Ott – piano, electric piano, arranger, conductor
Cornell Dupree, Eric Gale – guitar 
Chuck Rainey – electric bass
Bernard Purdie – drums
Other unidentified musicians – trumpet, trombone, tenor saxophone, baritone saxophone, string section, backing vocals

References

Capitol Records albums
Jimmy McGriff albums
Junior Parker albums
1970 albums
Albums produced by Sonny Lester
Albums arranged by Horace Ott
Albums conducted by Horace Ott